Onesmas Kimani Ngunjiri is a Kenyan politician who was a member of the National Assembly for Bahati Constituency. He is a member of the Jubilee Party.

Kimani Ngunjiri is as of June 2021 in the Jubilee Tanga Tanga formation and is an ardent supporter of William Ruto, the Deputy President of the Republic of Kenya. He is an extremely popular politician from Nakuru Kenya.

Early life and education 
Ngunjiri was born at Banita Sisal Estate in 1953 .He had his  primary in 1965  and Secondary education in 1971 at Michinda primary and Michinda secondary school for his EACE.

Political career 
He is a member of the Departmental Committee on Lands and the Committee on Implementation.

Election results

References

Kenyan politicians
Year of birth missing (living people)
Living people
Jubilee Party politicians
Members of the 12th Parliament of Kenya